The Fairbury Jeffersons were a Nebraska State League baseball team based in Fairbury, in the U.S. state of Nebraska, that played from 1922 to 1923 and from 1928 to 1930. They won their only league championship in their first year of existence, under manager George Segrist.

References

Jefferson County, Nebraska
Baseball teams established in 1922
Baseball teams disestablished in 1930
Defunct minor league baseball teams
Defunct baseball teams in Nebraska
1922 establishments in Nebraska
1930 disestablishments in Nebraska
Nebraska State League teams